Nikolai Vladimirovich Ekk (14 June 1902 – 14 July 1976) was a Soviet and Russian film director and screenwriter. "Ekk" was in fact a pseudonym; his real surname was Ivakin.

Born in Riga, he studied acting and directing in the theater of Vsevolod Meyerhold. He directed six feature films between 1929 and 1967. Among them was the first Soviet sound film Road to Life and the first Soviet color motion picture film The Nightingale.

Filmography
 How Should and How Shouldn't (Как надо и как не надо) (1929)
 Road to Life (Путёвка в жизнь) (1931)
 The Nightingale (Груня Корнакова) (1936)
 The Fair of Sorochinsk (Сорочинская ярмарка) (1938)
 When the Snow Is Falling... (Когда падает снег...) (1962)
 A Man in a Green Glove (1967)
The Nile and The Life (1968)
Those People of the Nile (1972)

Family

Nikolai Ekk was married to Ukrainian film actress Valentina Ivashova.

References

External links

1902 births
1976 deaths
20th-century Russian male actors
20th-century Russian screenwriters
20th-century Russian male writers
Gerasimov Institute of Cinematography alumni
Recipients of the Order of the Red Banner of Labour
Male screenwriters
Russian film directors
Soviet film directors
Soviet screenwriters